The June 15-16 Events of 1970 began in Istanbul and soon became one of the largest actions of organised labor in Turkey's history.

Changes in Union law
In 1970, the Grand National Assembly of Turkey and the Senate passed a bill amending two paces of legislation, the Collective Bargaining Agreement, Strike and Lockout Law No. 274, which regulated working life and basic union legislation, and the Law on Trade Unions No. 275. The bill as supported both by the governing Justice Party and the opposition Republican People's Party (CHP). The amendment significantly restricted the freedom of workers to choose unions and made it difficult to change unions. The law entered into force on 11 June 1970 with the approval of President Cevdet Sunay.

The bill was mainly aimed at preventing the flow of workers from Türk-İş to DİSK. DISK and its affiliated unions responded angrily to the new law and the Workers' Party of Turkey announced that it would take the controversial amendments to the Constitutional Court and filed a lawsuit to have them annulled.

Events across Istanbul
The response of trade unionists and leaders of DİSK entered a new phase on the morning of June 15, 1970, when they marched towards the main centers of Istanbul. The march, which started on the Anatolian side of the city, was followed by the workers from Kartal district along the E-5 Ankara highway, while others joined them from other factories. Around Göztepe, Otosan factory workers and DMO workers joined them and the march lasted until 17:00. Another march route was in Beykoz. It started in Paşabahçe and proceeded towards Üsküdar. On June 16, the workers' march that had started from Gebze joined with the workers from Kartal and reached the square in front of Kadıköy Pier.

On the European side of Istanbul, on June 15, 1970, a march was held along the Bakırköy - Topkapı - Sağmalcılar route. On 16 June, it joined up with branches marching in from other parts of the city and arrived at Eminönü. The Governor's Office had the two bridges on the Golden Horn were opened at that time, preventing the demonstrators from crossing over to Beyoğlu. 

When the workers occupied the Haymak factory in which Prime Minister Süleyman Demirel's brother Şevket Demirel was a partner, the troops of the 2nd Armored Brigade in Kartal Maltepe surrounded the factory. 

Around 75,000 workers from many factories took part in the demonstrations. Although the reaction was mainly from DİSK member workers, many Türk-İş workers joined the marches as well. In the evening of the first day, the government declared a 60-day period of martial law. Many of the leaders of DISK and its affiliated unions were arrested and tried by martial law courts. Workers were fired at from the barricade set up in front of the Fenerbahçe stadium. Many workers were injured in the conflict that broke out here. Around Kadıköy Pier, the police opened fire on the workers killing several.

On 16 June, minor incidents took place in Ankara, Adana, Bursa and İzmir.

Aftermath and legacy
On 16 June, martial law was declared in Kocaeli and Istanbul. After the 1971 and 1980 military coups, Kemal Türkler and other DİSK executives were tried for provoking the public and spreading separatist propaganda; they were acquitted in both cases.

After the events, CHP General Secretary Bülent Ecevit, together with Chairman İsmet İnönü, also sought to have the new law annulled in the Constitutional Court, separately from The Workers’ Party. The Constitutional Court later ruled on the lawsuits filed and annulled the amendments.

Those who died on June 16 were Yaşar Yıldırım, a worker at the Mutlu Battery Factory, Mustafa Bayram, a Vinylex worker, Mehmet Gıdak, a Walnut Monopoly Factory worker, Doğukan Dere, a tradesman, and Yusuf Kahraman, police officer.
Those who died in resistance under the repressive measures that followed the protests were Hüseyin Çapkan, a member of the Lastik-İş union, and Necmettin Giritlioğlu, Chairman of the Yapı-İş Union.

The protests of June 15-16 are commemorated by the Left in Turkey as they are the first large-scale working class action in the country’s history.

The People's Liberation Party was established on 15 June 2005, the 35th anniversary of the 15-16 June Worker Resistance.

Popular culture 

See also
Bloody Sunday (1969)
Taksim Square massacre

External links
interactive map of the protests
YouTube documentary on the protests (in Turkish)

Further reading
 Kemal Sülker, 15-16 Haziran Türkiyeyi Sarsan İki Uzun Gün, İleri Yayınları 2005, ISBN 975-6288-50-7
 Sırrı Öztürk, İşçi Sınıfı Sendikalar ve 15/16 Haziran, Sorun Yayınları 2001, ISBN 975-431-118-8
 Kamil Ateşoğulları, İki Uzun Gün ve Bir Uzun Yürüyüş, 15-16 Haziran, Birleşik Metal-İş Yayınları 2003, pdf

References

Protests in Turkey
1970 in Turkey
Trade unions in Turkey
Police brutality in Turkey